Saint Raphael the Archangel Catholic Church is a Roman Catholic Jesuit church located in Raleigh, North Carolina, United States.

St. Raphael is part of the Roman Catholic Diocese of Raleigh. The church is also the host of Saint Raphael the Archangel Catholic School. and Saint Raphael Preschool. The priests are members of the USA East Province of the Society of Jesus (the USA East Province was formed when the Maryland and USA Northeast provinces merged in 2020), the US Jesuit Portal, and Jesuits Worldwide.

Church
The Church of Saint Raphael the Archangel was dedicated in 1966 to serve a growing Catholic population.  In 1996 the Jesuits accepted pastorship of the parish.  It is the only Jesuit Parish in the Diocese of Raleigh.  In 1997 the parish started a Hispanic Ministry program and added Spanish masses to the services.  The main altar of St. Raphael's contains a relic of St. Elizabeth Ann Seton. The altar in the church's Chapel of Our Lady Queen of the Americas contains relics of Blessed Miguel Pro and of St. Katharine Drexel.

Motto 
To See as Christ Sees and Love as Christ Loves

Mission 
Saint Raphael the Archangel Catholic Parish is a diverse community of Catholic believers, called by baptism to share in the Christian mission of evangelization, worship, and service.

As stewards of this community, we commit our time, talent, and treasure to building the Body of Christ together.

Saint Ignatius Statue 
In 2014 a bronze life size statue of Saint Ignatius of Loyola, the founder of the Jesuits, was dedicated and blessed.  It is located outside of Ignatius Hall, a gym and social center at the parish.

Angel Fountain
The Masini family, parish members of St. Raphael's, dedicated a stone statue and fountain of an angel playing a flute in 1996 in honor of their daughter, Toni Christine Masini, who died in 1992.  The fountain was designed by two graduate students from North Carolina State University.

Chapels
The church has a Marian Chapel dedicated to Our Lady of Guadalupe, for daily mass, smaller liturgies and private prayer, as well as a Blessed Sacrament Chapel, used to reserve the Eucharist.

Schools
Saint Raphael the Archangel Catholic School and Saint Raphael Preschool, hosted on the grounds of the church, offer pre-school as well as grades kindergarten through eight.  The school feeds into Cardinal Gibbons Catholic High School. It is one of the only Jesuit-run schools in North Carolina.

Scholarships
Saint Raphael Catholic School offers the Ryan O’Connell Memorial Scholarship to assist families who come under unexpected distress or have financial issues. The scholarship was named in honor of Ryan O'Connell, a third grader at the school who died in the year 2000.

Sports Department
Saint Raphael Catholic School has the following sports teams:
 Boys Soccer
 Girls Volleyball
 Boys Varsity and JV Basketball
 Girls Varsity and JV Basketball
 Boys Lacrosse
 Girls Soccer
 Boys Varsity Baseball
 Cheerleading

See also

 List of Jesuit sites
 National Catholic Educational Association

References

External links
Roman Catholic Diocese of Raleigh, North Carolina

Roman Catholic churches in Raleigh, North Carolina
Hispanic and Latino American culture in North Carolina
Roman Catholic churches completed in 1966
Private schools in Raleigh, North Carolina
Catholic elementary schools in North Carolina
Jesuit churches in the United States
Roman Catholic Diocese of Raleigh
20th-century Roman Catholic church buildings in the United States